Revere Capital Advisors is a hedge fund based in New York City and London.

Locations
The firm has two locations. In New York City, it is located at 12 East 52nd Street on the island of Manhattan. In London, it is located at 3, Hill Street in Mayfair.

History
Revere Capital Advisors was established in 2008. Its co-founders are former executives at the Man Group: Harvey McGrath, formerly Chairman, Daniel Barnett, formerly Finance Director, and John Kinder, formerly Head of Global Sugar Trading.

Initial fund holdings came from Broadmark Asset Management, a fund based in San Francisco, and Dickson Capital, a London-based fund. In July 2011, they introduced the Revere Tactical Risk Fund, an equity investment tool with risk protection. In 2013, they launched REM Founders Fund, a dozen early stage funds, to investors. They also established Revere Merchant Capital, a merchant banking group within the firm.

References

Hedge fund firms in the United Kingdom
Hedge fund firms in New York City
2008 establishments in the United Kingdom
2008 establishments in New York City
Financial services companies established in 2008
Mayfair